Francis Wayland Palmer (October 11, 1827 – December 3, 1907) was an American politician, publisher, printer, editor and proprietor from New York, Iowa and Illinois.

Early life and education
Born in North Manchester, Indiana, Palmer moved to Jamestown, New York with his parents as a child and learned the printing trade at the Jamestown Journal in 1841.

Career 
Palmer became the owner of the newspaper in 1848 and was a member of the New York State Assembly (Chautauqua Co, 2nd D.) in 1854 and 1855. He sold the Jamestown Journal in 1858 and moved to Dubuque, Iowa the same year where he became editor and one of the proprietors of the Dubuque Times. Palmer served as Iowa state printer from 1861 to 1869, moved to Des Moines, Iowa in 1861 and was publisher and owner of the Iowa State Register. He was elected a Republican to the United States House of Representatives in 1868, serving from 1869 to 1873, not being a candidate for renomination in 1872. He moved to Chicago, Illinois in 1873 and purchased an interest in the Inter-Ocean, becoming its editor-in-chief. Palmer was a delegate to the Republican National Convention in 1876, was appointed postmaster of Chicago by President Rutherford B. Hayes in 1877, serving until 1885 and served as Public Printer of the United States from 1889 to 1894 and again from 1897 to 1905.

Personal life 
Palmer died in Chicago, Illinois on December 3, 1907, and was interred in Graceland Cemetery in Chicago.

External links

 Retrieved on 2009-05-12

1827 births
1907 deaths
Republican Party members of the New York State Assembly
Postmasters of Chicago
American printers
American newspaper editors
19th-century American newspaper publishers (people)
Politicians from Jamestown, New York
Politicians from Dubuque, Iowa
Politicians from Des Moines, Iowa
Politicians from Chicago
People of Iowa in the American Civil War
Burials at Graceland Cemetery (Chicago)
People from North Manchester, Indiana
Illinois Republicans
Republican Party members of the United States House of Representatives from Iowa
19th-century American politicians
Journalists from New York (state)
United States Government Publishing Office